Heriot-Watt University RFC is a rugby union club based in Edinburgh, Scotland. The club operates a men's team and a women's team. Both currently play in the university leagues.

History

Heriot-Watt University has a number of campuses in Scotland; and also one in Malaysia. Their Malaysian rugby union side are the Heriot-Watt Silverbacks.

The Heriot-Watt campus at Galashiels holds the Scottish Rugby Academy regional academy for the Borders and East Lothian.

Sides

Women's training takes place on Tuesday evenings from 5pm to 6.30pm at the Sports Academy.

Men's training takes place on Monday and Thursday afternoons from 3.30pm and 4.30pm.

There are 3 men's XVs.

Honours

Men

 Scottish Conference 2A
 Champions (1): 2004-05
 Scottish Conference Cup
 Champions (2): 2013–14, 2015

References

Rugby union in Edinburgh
Scottish rugby union teams
University and college rugby union clubs in Scotland